Zurdok was a Mexican rock band based in Monterrey. It was formed in 1993 under the name Zurdok Movimento, changing it several years later to simply Zurdok. It was one of the most important bands in the Mexican rock band scene at the end of the 1990s and the early 2000s.

The band recorded 3 studio albums that achieved success into the rock en español critics and audiences. Lead singer Fer Martz left the band in 1999 and Chetes remained as the main vocalist. 
They got into hiatus in 2002, when finally decided to finish the band in 2003. In 2006, Chetes released his solo career and Martz did a reunion of Zurdok along David Izquierdo.

Biography

Early years 

Jorge "Fletch" Sáenz and David Izquierdo were friends from elementary school who in 1993 decided to form a band. Maurizio Terracina joined as bassist and introduced them to Gerardo Garza (better known as Chetes). On 15 July 1993, the band met for the first time with the simple intention to make music, creating songs for themselves and not much of anything else.

After months writing and experimenting they decided to recruit a vocalist, one that with a powerful voice able to shout over the heavy sound which was a part of all their songs at the time. It was because of a recommendation from Alejandro Rosso (current Plastilina Mosh member) that Fernando Martz joined Zurdok. Later, keyboardist Gustavo "Cátsup" Hernández was brought in, and the Zurdok Movimento project was taken more seriously.

The group continued composing and made its live debut on 13 May 1994, in their hometown of Monterrey. Just a short time later, the name "Zurdok Movimento" became familiar around the city and the band began to receive more exposure. It wasn't until 1995 when the band's name was made known beyond Monterrey, winning what was then the most important rock-contest in Mexico: "the Battle of the Bands", competing against more than 400 groups from all over the country and thus becoming the first non-Mexico City group to earn this prestigious award.

Eventually, the name of Zurdok Movimento began to make the rounds and had a buzz going within the different transnational label companies. It helped that the executives of the companies started to care about the music of the north of Mexico and signing to Zurdok Movimento with Discos Manicomio, then a subdivision of Polygram.

Antena 

In January 1997 Zurdok Movimento went to Los Angeles to record its first album with producer Jason Roberts (who had worked with Cypress Hill, and the well-known Monterrey group Control Machete). In August 1997 the Antena album was released, widening the group's exposure in several parts of the country. With Chetes established as a vocalist, they became a group with two lead vocalists. "Tropecé" was the first single to come off this album, which was followed with "Si me hablas al revés", "Gallito Inglés" and "No Importa".

Hombre Sintetizador 

The band had plenty of learning experiences during the recording and promotion of Antena, and with a name change (now simply called "Zurdok"), they felt ready to record their second album. In November 1998, the recording of Hombre Sintetizador began, working on almost all tracks with producer Peter Reardon. Most of the recording took place in a mansion on the outskirts of Monterrey, which Zurdok set up as recording studio. The group decided on a sound influenced by such Britpop bands as Oasis and Radiohead.

This album's first single, "Abre los ojos", got the attention of Monterrey music critics, calling it "one of the best songs that Monterrey rock has produced". David Ruiz, aka "Leche" directed the video for the same song.

After promoting the first single, Reardon decided to take Fernando Martz to LA for new projects as he saw his talent, Fernando Martz left the band. Two years later, he announced that he decided to start a solo project in Los Angeles, called Envértigo. Zurdok became a quintet.

After Fernando Martz's departure, Zurdok moved on with the radio success of "Si me adverti", written and composed by Fernando Martz, the melodic "Cuántos Pasos", and the hypnotic "Luna". With this last song, Zurdok closed the cycle of Hombre Sintetizador, and continued on. This album consolidated the band's status as it was called "one of best rock albums in Spanish". Zurdok gained fans throughout the continent, including the United States. They went on tour during 1999 and 2000.

Maquillaje 

After the success of the Hombre Sintetizador, Zurdok returned to the recording studio to make what would be their most ambitious project. The band flew to L.A in August 2000 to meet with producer Peter Reardon and record their third album: Maquillaje which was recorded in the famous Capitol Records studios in L.A. as well as in Reardon's own studio.

After the recording, Zurdok lost yet another member. Gustavo "Cátsup" Hernández decided to leave the band to dedicate himself to making videos and to begin logistical planning for a movie. After the exit of Catsup, Zurdok regrouped and put everything in order for the release of their third album, Maquillaje. They decided to only send out pre-singles made available only on over the Internet, the first was "Asi Es". Later, they chose "Estatico" as their first actual radio single, simultaneously releasing it with a video. After "Estatico", it was "Para Siempre".

Dissolution and reunion 

After opening for British band Placebo, the group decided to go on hiatus in 2002, as its contract with Universal Music was up. Nevertheless, in 2003, the group announced that the hiatus would be definite due to "artistic differences" between the members of the group, effectively ending Zurdok.

Fernando Martz and David Izquierdo decided to revive Zurdok's old glories by re-grouping in 2006. They made a pair of appearances recruiting Daniel Plascencia, Charly Pornet and Roi Zerda (the last two members of Jumbo) for the new lineup. It is notable that, during these new appearances, they performed songs of the first two Zurdok records (the ones on which Martz was present). After a good response from the audience at the 2006 Vive Latino festival, they performed in their home town of Monterrey on 21 April 2006, at the well-known Cafe Iguana, for a sold-out crowd while hundreds of people remained outside unable to get in.

As a result of this, the Chetes-Terracina band Vaquero also started performing the song "Si me advertí". Chetes decided to do the same as a solo artist, playing four Zurdok songs at his concert at the Mexico City Metropolitan Theater.
 
Months later, David Izquierto wrote a letter to the unofficial site Hombre Sintetizador, saying that "the reunited band  play any more concerts or record an album because Martz moved to another country".

After-Zurdok projects 

In 2005, Chetes and Terracina formed a Project called Vaquero. Their first single was "Dying to Live", which was a minor hit in the music charts at Mexico. The project is now in hiatus and it's unknown if they will release a follow-up album.

Chetes released his debut album as a solo artist in 2006: Blanco Fácil (Easy Target), which was produced by ex-Wilco Ken Coomer. It has a softer sound than that of Zurdok, and did quite well on the pop and rock charts. His second album is called "Efecto Dominó".

In that same year, David Izquierdo started a project with Marcela Bovio (singer of Elfonia) called Dalai.. Mauricio Terracina started his own band called The Volture and Gustavo Mauricio is now part of the indie-pop band Quiero Club.

In 2007 Universal Music released a compilation of Zurdok's greatest hits, including a DVD with all their videos and some interviews.

In 2009 Fernando Martz creates Martz Band After almost 9 years after his departure from Zurdok coming back with a personal sound going back to his raw grunge roots, first studio album to be released in 2014. Martz Band later changed its name to Heliptica and continuous releasing music under that name.

Line-ups

1993–1999 

Fernando Martz
Gerardo "Chetes" Garza
David Izquierdo
Maurizio Terracina
Jorge "Fletch" Sáenz
Gustavo "Cátsup" Hernández

1999–2001 

Gerardo "Chetes" Garza
David Izquierdo
Maurizio Terracina
Jorge "Fletch" Sáenz
Gustavo "Cátsup" Hernández

2001–2003 

Gerardo "Chetes" Garza
David Izquierdo
Maurizio Terracina
Jorge "Fletch" Sáenz

2006 reunion 

Fernando Martz
David Izquierdo
Daniel Plascencia
Charly Pornet
Roi Zerda

2014/2022 reunion 

Gerardo "Chetes" Garza
David Izquierdo
Maurizio Terracina
Gustavo "Cátsup" Hernández
David "Rojo" García

Discography 

Antena – April 1997
Hombre Sintetizador – August 1999
Maquillaje – June 2001
Lo Mejor de Zurdok (Compilation album) – 2007
Gran Salto 1997-2014 (Boxset) – 2014

See also 

 Avanzada Regia

External links 

 Zurdok – Official Site

Mexican rock music groups
Mexican post-rock groups
Mexican alternative rock groups
Musical groups from Monterrey
Mexican grunge groups
Musical groups established in 1993
Musical groups disestablished in 2002